Kastanochori or Kastanochorion may refer to the following places in Greece:

Kastanochori, Arcadia, a village in the municipality Megalopoli, Arcadia
, a village in the municipal unit Tragilos, Serres regional unit